Pleurothallis adelphe is a species of orchid plant native to Ecuador.

References 

adelphe
Flora of Ecuador